Shawswick Township is one of nine townships in Lawrence County, Indiana, United States. As of the 2010 census, its population was 20,469 and it contained 9,653 housing units.

History
Shawswick Township was established in 1818. The township was named from a combination of the surnames Shaw and Wick. Wick was the name of a judge and Shaw was the name of a war hero; the final name Shawswick was formed in a compromise.

The Helton-Mayo Farm was listed in the National Register of Historic Places in 1995.

Geography

Cities, towns, villages
 Bedford
 Oolitic (vast majority)

Unincorporated towns
 Crawford at 
 East Oolitic at 
 Englewood at 
 Erie at 
 Riverview at 
 Shawswick at 
(This list is based on USGS data and may include former settlements.)

Cemeteries
The township contains these nine cemeteries: Beech Grove, Breckinridge, Crawford, Green Hill, Ikerd, Scoggan, Sherril, Starr and Williams.

Major highways
  U.S. Route 50
  State Road 37
  State Road 54
  State Road 58

Airports and landing strips
 Virgil I Grissom Municipal Airport

School districts
 North Lawrence Community Schools

Political districts
 Indiana's 9th congressional district
 State House District 65
 State Senate District 44

References
 
 United States Census Bureau 2008 TIGER/Line Shapefiles
 IndianaMap

External links
 Indiana Township Association
 United Township Association of Indiana
 City-Data.com page for Shawswick Township

Townships in Lawrence County, Indiana
Townships in Indiana
1818 establishments in Indiana
Populated places established in 1818